An automat is a type of restaurant.

Automat may also refer to:

 Automat (Romano Musumarra and Claudio Gizzi album), 1978
 Automat (Metz album), 2019
 Automat (painting), a 1927 painting by Edward Hopper
 Automat Pictures, an entertainment production company based in Los Angeles
 The Automat, a 2021 documentary on Horn & Hardart automats

See also
 Automata (disambiguation)
 Automatic (disambiguation)
 Automaton (disambiguation)